1998 in television may refer to:

1998 in American television
1998 in Australian television
1998 in Austrian television
1998 in Belgian television
1998 in Brazilian television
1998 in British television
1998 in Canadian television
1998 in Croatian television
1998 in Czech television
1998 in Dutch television
1998 in Estonian television
1998 in French television
1998 in German television
1998 in Greek television
1998 in Irish television
1998 in Israeli television
1998 in Japanese television
1998 in New Zealand television
1998 in Norwegian television
1998 in Philippine television
1998 in Polish television
1998 in Portuguese television
1998 in Russian television
1998 in Scottish television
1998 in South African television
1998 in Swedish television